Pappireddipatti taluk is a taluk in the Dharmapuri district of the Indian state of Tamil Nadu. The headquarters of the taluk is the town of Pappireddipatti.

Demographics
According to the 2011 census, the taluk of Pappireddipatti had a population of 241,116 with 122,690  males and 118,426 females. There were 965 women for every 1000 men. The taluk had a literacy rate of 64.67. Child population in the age group below 6 was 11,754 Males and 11,071 Females.

References

Taluks of Dharmapuri district